SLC41A1 is a protein that in humans is encoded by the gene SLC41A1. It is homologous to the prokaryotic Mg++ transfer protein MgtE

Mutations in this gene have been associated to Nephronophthisis-like phenotypes.

References

Human proteins
Solute carrier family